Marco Gentile (born 24 August 1968) is a Dutch professional footballer who played as a central defender for Burnley in the Football League.

References

1968 births
Living people
Dutch footballers
Burnley F.C. players
Willem II (football club) players
Dumbarton F.C. players
ADO Den Haag players
MVV Maastricht players
FC Volendam players
English Football League players
Association football defenders
Footballers from The Hague